was an official in the Imperial Household Ministry and a co-founder with Michiharu Mishima of the Boy Scouts of Japan in April 1922, with Shinpei Gotō at its helm.

Yoshinori Futara was awarded the title Count on November 22, 1909.

Background
Count Futara was the first Japanese member of the World Scout Committee of the World Organization of the Scout Movement, from 1931 until 1939.

A Japanese Scout group led by Yoshinori Futara visited Germany in 1937. A photograph exists of Baldur von Schirach together with Futara as spectators at fight games of the Hitler Youth, the youth organisation of the National Socialist German Workers Party in Bremen, Germany, taken August 15, 1937.

In 1956 he received the highest distinction of the Scout Association of Japan, the Golden Pheasant Award.

Published works
Futara, Yoshinori and Sawada, Setsuzo (official of Foreign Affairs) 1924. Kotaishi Denka gogaiuki The Crown Prince's foreign travel record. Publishers Nichinichi Newspaper Company, Tokyo and Mainichi Newspaper Company, Osaka. Translated into English by the staff of the Osaka Mainichi
Futara, Yoshinori and Sawada, Setsuzo 1926. The Crown Prince's European Tour. Translated into English by the staff of the Osaka Mainichi

References

External links and references
http://content.cdlib.org/view?docId=kt3g5020r9&chunk.id=dsc-1.2.7&query=korean&brand=oac
Hirohito and the Making of Modern Japan by Herbert P. Bix
http://forum.axishistory.com/viewtopic.php?t=101635
http://www.ullsteinbild.de/
An Official History of Scouting by Paul Moynihan https://books.google.com/books?id=q4vwlP5qJowC&pg=PA144&lpg=PA144&dq=futara+yoshinori&source=web&ots=hm7U73KKPc&sig=GJ1TIUlvax6B508BCywxJ5YyVos#PPA126,M1
https://web.archive.org/web/20091027071728/http://www.geocities.com/jtaliaferro.geo/fushimi.html
http://www.unterstein.net/or/docs/JapanPeers.pdf
http://www.oliver-rost.homepage.t-online.de/Japan_Pairie.txt

1886 births
1967 deaths
Scouting in Japan
Kazoku
Scouting pioneers
World Scout Committee members